The 1951 Kansas Jayhawks football team represented the University of Kansas in the Big Seven Conference during the 1951 college football season. In their fourth season under head coach Jules V. Sikes, the Jayhawks compiled an 8–2 record (4–2 against conference opponents), finished third in the Big Seven Conference, and outscored all opponents by a combined total of 316 to 208. They played their home games at Memorial Stadium in Lawrence, Kansas.

The team's statistical leaders included Bob Brandeberry with 649 rushing yards, Bud Laughlin with 78 points scored, and Jerry Robertson with 925 passing yards. Aubrey Linville and Bill Schaake were the team captains.

Schedule

References

Kansas
Kansas Jayhawks football seasons
Kansas Jayhawks football